George Metcalf (1885–?) was a professional footballer, who played for Sunderland, North Shields and Huddersfield Town.

References

1885 births
Year of death missing
English footballers
Sportspeople from Easington, County Durham
Footballers from County Durham
Association football defenders
English Football League players
North Shields F.C. players
Huddersfield Town A.F.C. players
Sunderland A.F.C. players